Gessica Kayane Rocha de Vasconcelos, better known as Gkay, is a Brazilian actress, YouTuber and TikToker. As an actress, she is best known for starring in the films Christmas Full of Grace and Carnaval on Netflix, and Os Roni on the Multishow channel. She is the presenter of the reality television show LOL: Se Rir, Já Era! from Amazon Prime Video.

Filmography

Television

Movies

Awards and nominations

References

External links
 

Living people
21st-century Brazilian actresses
Year of birth missing (living people)